Into Paradise may refer to:

 Into Paradise (band), an indie rock group from Dublin, Ireland
 Into Paradise (All Angels album), 2007
 Into Paradise (Sissel album), 2006